John A. Alonzo, ASC (June 12, 1934 – March 13, 2001) was an American cinematographer, television director, and actor known for his diverse body of work in both film and television.

Alonzo pioneered handheld work, lighting techniques and high-definition video development during his career. He is remembered mainly for Chinatown (1974) and Scarface (1983), the former for which he was nominated for both a BAFTA and an Academy Award. In addition, he was the recipient of a Primetime Emmy for his work on the 2000 CBS television adaptation of Fail Safe.

Alonzo was the first American cinematographer of Mexican-American and Latino heritage to become a member of the Cinematographer's Union in Los Angeles, as well as the first to be inducted into the ASC.

Career 

Alonzo's career began as part of the clean-up crew at television station WFAA in Dallas.  However, within a short time, he had made himself indispensable, not only building sets, hanging lights and moving cameras, but also directing cooking and children's shows.  Eventually, he and actor Hank Williamson created a popular comedy duo:  Alonzo became the voice and puppeteer of the irreverent “Señor Turtle,” who with Williamson as his sidekick, introduced movies and cartoons.  In 1956, the show was picked up by station KHJ in Hollywood, where it lasted only 26 weeks.  So Alonzo worked for a time as a still photographer, and as an actor, with appearances in several well-known shows such as Twilight Zone (Season 2 – Episode 12 in "Dust" as Luis Gallegos), Combat!, 77 Sunset Strip, and The Alfred Hitchcock Hour.

A seminal moment came during the shooting of The Magnificent Seven, in which Alonzo had a small role, when he met the cinematographer Charles Lang.  This inspiring encounter, as well as the chance to briefly collaborate with James Wong Howe a few years later, finally gave Alonzo the impetus to devote his life to cinematography.  By the mid-1960s, he was photographing many documentaries for National Geographic and the David L. Wolper Company, and greatly influencing the innovative "Look" of the New Hollywood that became so powerful in the late 1960s and early 1970s.

His uncomplicated and minimalistic style, combined with his first-hand knowledge of acting, made him one of the most in-demand directors of photography in Hollywood. In addition, he was not only one of the best "hand-held cameramen in Hollywood, but also a pioneer of high-def digital cinematography.  In 1993/94 he shot (for NBC) the first HD movie in the history of American television, World War II: When Lions Roared.

Alonzo died in 2001 after a long illness, at home in Brentwood, California. Perhaps his best known student is two-time Oscar winner John Toll, who began his career as Alonzo's assistant on films like Black Sunday, Norma Rae, Tom Horn and Scarface.

In 2007, director Axel Schill helmed a feature documentary about Alonzo, The Man Who Shot Chinatown – The Life & Work of John A. Alonzo.

Filmography (Cinematographer)

Films

1970s

1980s

1990s

2000s

Television

Filmography (Actor)

Documentaries 
 Visions of Light (1992)
 The Making of Scarface (1998)
 Guns For Hire: The Making of the Magnificent Seven (2000)
 The Man Who Shot Chinatown – The Life & Work of John A. Alonzo (2007)

Awards and nominations

Primetime Emmy Awards 

 Won: Primetime Emmy Award for Outstanding Light Direction; Fail Safe (2000)
 Nominated: Primetime Emmy Award for Outstanding Cinematography for a Limited Series or Movie; World War: When Lions Roared (1994)
 Nominated Primetime Emmy Award for Outstanding Cinematography for a Limited Series or Movie; Lansky (1999)

Academy Awards 

 Nominated: Academy Award for Best Live Action Short Film; The Legend of Jimmy Blue Eyes (1964)
 Nominated: Academy Award for Best Cinematography; Chinatown (1975)

BAFTA Awards 

 Nominated: BAFTA Award for Best Cinematography; Chinatown (1975)

References

External links

American cinematographers
American film directors of Mexican descent
Male actors from Dallas
1934 births
2001 deaths
American male actors
Film directors from Texas
American male actors of Mexican descent